American rapper, singer, and songwriter Brooke Candy has released one studio album, one extended play, one mixtape, twenty-seven singles, and twenty-six music videos.

Studio albums

Extended plays

Mixtapes

Singles

As lead artist

As featured artist

Guest appearances

DJ mixes

Music videos

References

Candy, Brooke
Hip hop discographies